Omar Khaled Mohamed Marmoush (born 7 February 1999) is an Egyptian professional footballer who plays as a forward for Bundesliga club VfL Wolfsburg and the Egypt national team.

Club career
Marmoush made his professional debut for Wadi Degla in the Egyptian Premier League on 8 July 2016, coming on as a substitute in the match against Al-Ittihad, which finished as a 3–2 win. In total, he made sixteen league appearances for Wadi Degla and scored two goals, before moving to VfL Wolfsburg II in 2017.

On 5 January 2021, Marmoush was loaned to FC St. Pauli for the remainder of the season.  He played 21 games and scored 7 goals for the club.

On 30 August 2021, Marmoush was loaned out to VfB Stuttgart until the end of the season. He scored a last minute equalizer vs Eintracht Frankfurt on his debut. He was later named Bundesliga rookie of the month for September 2021. Marmoush was also named Bundesliga Rookie of the Month for March 2022. He completed his loan spell and returned to VfL Wolfsburg having scored 3 goals in 21 games.

International career
Marmoush was included in Egypt's squad for the 2017 Africa U-20 Cup of Nations in Zambia. He made two appearances during the tournament, in which Egypt were eliminated in the group stage.

Marmoush is also a Canadian citizen and was eligible for the Canadian national team before becoming cap-tied with the Egyptian national team in October 2021.

On 8 October 2021, Marmoush made his debut for the Egypt national team and scored the only goal in a 1–0 victory over Libya.

On 29 December 2021, Marmoush was named in Egypt's 28-man squad for the 2021 Africa Cup of Nations. He played in all three group stage matches, as well as all four knockout ties en route to the final against Senegal which ended in a 4–2 loss on penalties for Egypt.

On 19 March 2022, Marmoush was called up for Egypt's 2022 FIFA World Cup qualification third round matches against Senegal. He played in both matches as Egypt were defeated 3–1 on penalties and knocked out of World Cup contention.

On 27 September 2022, Marmoush scored the opening goal as Egypt beat Liberia 3–0 in a friendly match.

International goals 
Scores and results list Egypt's goal tally first.

Honours 
VfL Wolfsburg II
Regionalliga: 2018–19
Egypt
Africa Cup of Nations runner-up: 2021

Individual 
 Bundesliga Rookie of the Month: September 2021, March 2022

References

External links

 Profile at the VfL Wolfsburg website
 
 
 
 Omar Marmoush at FilGoal.com 

1999 births
Living people
Egyptian footballers
Egypt youth international footballers
Egypt international footballers
Egyptian expatriate footballers
Egyptian expatriate sportspeople in Germany
Expatriate footballers in Germany
Association football forwards
Wadi Degla SC players
VfL Wolfsburg II players
VfL Wolfsburg players
VfB Stuttgart players
FC St. Pauli players
Egyptian Premier League players
Bundesliga players
2. Bundesliga players
Regionalliga players
Footballers from Cairo
Egypt under-20 international footballers
2021 Africa Cup of Nations players